Simon Whatling (born 16 September 1984) is an English rugby union player, who plays for London Welsh in the Aviva Championship. Whatling had previously played for the Worcester Warriors and the Cornish Pirates. He plays at Centre or Fly-half.

1984 births
Living people
English rugby union players
London Welsh RFC players
Worcester Warriors players
Rugby union players from Bath, Somerset
Rugby union centres